Kontiki or Kon-Tiki may refer to:

The raft used by Thor Heyerdahl in his 1947 Kon-Tiki expedition.
The Kon-Tiki Expedition: By Raft Across the South Seas, his 1948 book about the expedition
Kon-Tiki (1950 film), the 1950 documentary of his voyage
Kon-Tiki (2012 film), a 2012 Norwegian film
Kon-Tiki Museum, a Norwegian museum devoted to the expedition
Kon-Tiki (Scouting), an annual Scout raft building competition held in South Africa and Australia
"Kon-Tiki" (song) a song by the Shadows
Kontiki (company), a peer-assisted content delivery company
Kontiki (computer), a 1980s Norwegian computer system
Kon Tiki (album) an album by Cotton Mather
"Kontiki", an EDM song by Hardwell and Dannic
 Con-Tici or Kon-Tiki, an old name for the Andean deity Viracocha
 A small craft used to pull a longline fishing line out to sea from the shore

See also
Contiki (disambiguation)